Liotard is a surname, and may refer to:

Jean-Étienne Liotard (1702–1789), Swiss-French painter
Kartika Liotard (born 1971,died 2020), Dutch politician and Member of the European Parliament
Thérèse Liotard (born 1949), French actress